Spilarctia inayatullahi is a moth in the family Erebidae. It was described by Vladimir Viktorovitch Dubatolov and Vladimir O. Gurko in 2004. It is found in Pakistan.

References

Moths described in 2004
inayatullahi